Antoinette Amalie of Brunswick-Wolfenbüttel (Antoinette Amalie; 14 April 1696 – 6 March 1762) was a Duchess of Brunswick-Wolfenbüttel by marriage to Ferdinand Albert II of Brunswick-Wolfenbüttel. She was the mother of the Queen of Prussia, the Duchess of Saxe-Coburg-Saalfeld and the Queen of Denmark and Norway.

Life

Antoinette Amalie was the youngest of four daughters born to Louis Rudolph of Brunswick-Wolfenbüttel and his wife Princess Christine Louise of Oettingen-Oettingen. Her older sister was Elisabeth Christine, mother of Empress Maria Theresa. Her other surviving sister Charlotte Christine was the daughter-in-law of Peter the Great of Russia.

Marriage

15 October 1712 saw her marriage to her father's first cousin Ferdinand Albert II of Brunswick-Wolfenbüttel, son of Ferdinand Albert I, Duke of Brunswick-Wolfenbüttel-Bevern and Princess Christine of Hesse-Eschwege. 

The marriage was described as very happy and Antoinette was the mother of eight sons and six daughters. In March 1735, her father the Duke of Brunswick-Lüneburg died and her husband succeeded him. Her husband himself died September the same year. The Dowager Duchess went on to survive her husband for 27 years.

Issue
Charles I, Duke of Brunswick-Wolfenbüttel (1 August 1713 – 26 March 1780) married Princess Philippine Charlotte of Prussia and had issue.
Anthony Ulrich of Brunswick-Wolfenbüttel (28 August 1714 – 4 May 1774) married Grand Duchess Anna Leopoldovna of Russia and had issue.
Elisabeth Christine of Brunswick-Wolfenbüttel (8 November 1715 – 13 January 1797) married Frederick II of Prussia, no issue.
Louis Ernest of Brunswick-Wolfenbüttel (25 September 1718 – 12 May 1788) died unmarried.
August of Brunswick-Wolfenbüttel (1719–1720)
Ferdinand of Brunswick-Wolfenbüttel (12 January 1721 – 3 July 1792) died unmarried.
Luise of Brunswick-Wolfenbüttel (29 January 1722 – 13 January 1780) married Prince Augustus William of Prussia and had issue.
Sophie Antoinette of Brunswick-Wolfenbüttel (13/23 January 1724 – 17 May 1802) married Ernest Frederick, Duke of Saxe-Coburg-Saalfeld and had issue.
Albert of Brunswick-Wolfenbüttel (1725–1745) died unmarried.
Charlotte Christine Louise of Brunswick-Wolfenbüttel (1725–1766) Canoness in Quedlinburg, died unmarried.
Theresa Natalie of Brunswick-Wolfenbüttel (4 June 1728 – 26 June 1778) Princess-Abbess of Gandersheim, died unmarried.
Juliana Maria of Brunswick-Wolfenbüttel (4 September 1729 – 10 October 1796) married Frederick V of Denmark and had issue.
Frederick William of Brunswick-Wolfenbüttel (1731–1732) died in infancy.
Frederick Francis of Brunswick-Wolfenbüttel (1732–1758) died unmarried.

Ancestry

References

1696 births
1762 deaths
House of Brunswick-Bevern
17th-century German people
18th-century German people
Duchesses of Brunswick-Wolfenbüttel
Burials at Brunswick Cathedral
Daughters of monarchs